James O'Sullivan (1867 – 22 April 1921) was a member of the Queensland Legislative Assembly.

Biography
O'Sullivan was born in Horsham, Sussex, the son of Flurence O'Sullivan and his wife Catherine (née McCarthy). He married Anastasia O'Brien at Mount Morgan in 1897 and they had two sons.

He died in Brisbane in April 1921 and his funeral proceeded from St. Mary's Catholic Church, South Brisbane to the Toowong Cemetery.

Public career
O'Sullivan held the seat of Kennedy for the Labor Party in the Queensland Legislative Assembly from 1909 until his defeat in 1920.

References

Members of the Queensland Legislative Assembly
1867 births
1921 deaths
Burials at Toowong Cemetery
Australian Labor Party members of the Parliament of Queensland